Divine Retribution (世紀之戰) is a TV drama series broadcast by ATV in Hong Kong on 11 September 2000.  The series is supposed to be a sequel to TVB's 1992 series The Greed of Man, and was initially called (大時代2000), literally "Greed of Man 2000".  Part of the reason for the name change (Chinese + English) was said to be due to legal rights disputes. Douban reviews have suggested that the sequel to a TVB series being adopted by a rival channel ATV was actually not a major controversy.

Synopsis
The series takes place in the future year of 2003, where the stock market has created financial crisis that caused complete chaos in the Asia pacific regions.  Ting Yeh (Adam Cheng) and Fong San-hap (Sean Lau) now renew their battle and continue where they left off.

Characters
The roles by Sean Lau and Adam Cheng are mainly unchanged from the previous series despite the name change. Other characters from The Greed of Man were portrayed by different actors cast by ATV, while Amy Kwok, who had a role in The Greed of Man, portrays a different character in this series.

Fong family

Ting family

Others

External links
 Official site

References

Asia Television original programming
2000 Hong Kong television series debuts
2000 Hong Kong television series endings
Financial thrillers
Serial drama television series
2000s Hong Kong television series